Threemile Creek is a stream in Campbell County, Kentucky, in the United States. It is a tributary of the Licking River.

A defensive position originally called Threemile Creek Battery was built in 1861 as part of the Defense of Cincinnati in the Civil War and it took its name from the nearby creek.

See also
List of rivers of Kentucky

References

Rivers of Campbell County, Kentucky
Rivers of Kentucky
Licking River (Kentucky)